Veljul River may refer to:
 Velju Mare, in Bihor County, Romania
 Veljul Mic, a tributary of the Velju Mare in Bihor County, Romania
 Veljul Negreștilor, a tributary of the Velju Mare in Bihor County, Romania
 Veljul Pustei, a tributary of the Veljul Negreștilor in Bihor County, Romania
 Veljul Selișteoara, a tributary of the Valea Nouă Chișer in Arad County, Romania